The Humboldt Fault or Humboldt Fault Zone, is a normal fault or series of faults, that extends from Nebraska southwestwardly through most of Kansas.

Kansas is not particularly earthquake prone, ranking 45th out of 50 states by damage caused.  However, the north-central part of the state, particularly Riley and Pottawatomie counties, is the most prone to earthquakes. The Humboldt Fault had the largest  earthquake in Kansas history with the 1867 Manhattan, Kansas earthquake. It happened near the town of Wamego and was estimated at about 5.5 on the Richter scale. Reportedly it was felt as far away as Dubuque, Iowa.

See also
Midcontinent Rift System
Nemaha Ridge

References

Geology of Kansas
Geology of Nebraska
Seismic faults of the United States
Geography of Omaha, Nebraska